Robert Chesenhale (died c. 1402), of Guildford, Surrey, and Artington, Surrey, was an English politician.

He was a Member (MP) of the Parliament of England for Guildford in January 1377, January 1380, 1381, February 1383, February 1388 and September 1397.

References

14th-century births
1402 deaths
English MPs January 1377
English MPs January 1380
English MPs 1381
English MPs February 1383
English MPs February 1388
English MPs September 1397
14th-century English politicians
People from Guildford
Members of Parliament for Guildford